was a novelist and critic. He was born in 1916 in Fukuoka Prefecture and dropped out of Kyushu University. He was a Marxist throughout his life.

Works
Divine Comedy (novel)

See also
Shoichi Watanabe – He and Onishi argued about human rights of natural-born handicapped.

References

External links
Official site KYOJIN-KAN

1916 births
2014 deaths
Japanese novelists